The Vyšehrad Chapter, officially the Royal Collegiate Chapter of Ss. Peter and Paul at Vyšehrad, is a collegiate chapter established at the church dedicated to Saints Peter and Paul in Vyšehrad (now in Prague) around 1070 by Vratislaus II, the first king of Bohemia.

Footnotes

Sources

External links 
  

History of Prague
11th century in Bohemia
1070 establishments in Europe